Washington Teasdale (8 August 1830 – 19 September 1903) was an engineer and photographer. He invented the field naturalist's microscope and was one of the first people to  use lantern slides.

Early life

He was born in Brunswick Place, Leeds, Yorkshire to a wealthy family. Teasdale trained to be an engineer and worked in India on engineering projects. He became fluent in Hindi, and according to his obituary, continued to think in it all his life. His particular scientific interest was in photography. He was one of the first people to prepare and use lantern slides in lectures.

Man of science

Teasdale, who delivered hundreds of lectures throughout his lifetime, was a founding member of the Leeds Photographic Society, the Royal Society of Microscopy and was a Fellow of the Royal Astronomical Society. Part of his photography collection, including cyanotype photography, is held at the Museum of the History of Science, Oxford. He photographed his scientific friends Henry Perigal and James Glaisher. As part of his work with the Society of Microscopy he invented the Field Naturalist's Microscope – a portable instrument of magnification. He died whilst attending a meeting of the British Association for the Advancement of Science.

References 

Engineers from Yorkshire
19th-century English photographers
1830 births
1903 deaths
People from Leeds
Microscopists
Photographers from Yorkshire